Helderson Leite Lima, better known as Nenen (born March 25, 1990), is a Brazilian football player.

References

1990 births
Living people
Brazilian footballers
J2 League players
Shonan Bellmare players
Association football forwards